Gombeleh (also Romanized as Gombelah, Gūmeleh, and Gomeleh) is a village in Darb-e Gonbad Rural District, Darb-e Gonbad District, Kuhdasht County, Lorestan Province, Iran. At the 2006 census, its population was 259, in 48 families.

References 

Towns and villages in Kuhdasht County